The Nigerian Independence Medal was authorised by Queen Elizabeth II on the occasion of the granting of independence to Nigeria to give recognition to individuals of the Royal Nigerian Military Forces, Royal Nigerian Navy and the Nigeria Police Force serving on 1 October 1960 and to members of the British Army who were seconded to the Royal Nigerian Military Forces.

Description
 The circular cupro-nickel Nigerian Independence Medal features the crowned effigy of Queen Elizabeth II.
 The reverse of the medal depicts the Nigerian Coat of Arms and the inscription Nigeria Independence, 1st October 1960.
 The ribbon has a three vertical stripes, green, white and green.

Notable recipients
 Emmanuel E Ikwue
 Hassan Katsina

References

Orders, decorations, and medals of Nigeria
Military awards and decorations of the United Kingdom
Awards established in 1960